The Czechoslovakia men's national under-16 basketball team was a national basketball team of Czechoslovakia. It represented the country in men's international under-16 basketball competitions.

FIBA U16 European Championship participations

See also
Czechoslovakia men's national basketball team
Czechoslovakia men's national under-18 basketball team

References

External links
Archived records of Czechoslovakia team participations

Czechoslovakia national basketball team
Men's national under-16 basketball teams